Paracoosia is an extinct genus of trilobites in the family Anomocaridae.  The genus lived from 501 to 490 million years ago during the Dresbachian faunal stage of the late Cambrian Period.

References

Cambrian trilobites
Cambrian trilobites of Asia
Anomocaridae